Habiger is a surname. Notable people with the surname include:

Dave Habiger (born 1969), American businessman and entrepreneur
Eugene E. Habiger (born 1939), United States Air Force general